Kristina Reiss (born 1952) is a German mathematics educator. She is professor of mathematics education and dean of education at the Technical University of Munich, where she holds the Heinz Nixdorf Chair of Mathematics Education.

Education and career
Reiss studied mathematics beginning in 1971 at Heidelberg University, completing her doctorate (Dr. rer. nat.) there in 1980. Her dissertation, Eine allgemeinere Kennzeichnung der sporadischen einfachen Gruppe von Rudvalis, concerned group theory and was supervised by Zvonimir Janko.

She worked as a researcher at the Karlsruhe University of Education from 1980 until 1991, when she became a professor of mathematics at the Stuttgart Technology University of Applied Sciences. She moved in 1992 to the University of Flensburg, in 1997 to the University of Oldenburg, in 2002 to the University of Augsburg, and in 2005 to the Technical University of Munich (TUM). At TUM, she was initially a professor of mathematics and computer science education and since 2009 as Heinz Nixdorf Chair of Mathematics Education. Since 2014 she has been dean of the TUM School of Education.

Recognition
In 2011 Reiss joined Acatech, the German Academy of Science and Engineering.

References

External links

1952 births
Living people
20th-century German mathematicians
Women mathematicians
Mathematics educators
Heidelberg University alumni
Academic staff of the University of Oldenburg
Academic staff of the University of Augsburg
Academic staff of the Technical University of Munich
21st-century German mathematicians